Iskandar Coastal Bridge or Jambatan Persisir Pantai Iskandar (Jawi: جمبتن ڤسيسير ڤنتاي إسکندر) is an arch-shaped river bridge in Johor Bahru District, Johor, Malaysia. It is a second arch bridge in Johor Bahru after Permas Jaya Bridge. The bridge crosses Skudai River and Danga River. The bridge is built to shorten the travel distance between Iskandar Puteri to Johor Bahru town area from—km (estimated) to—km (Estimated).

History
The construction of the bridge was proposed when a new coastal highway from Danga Bay to Nusajaya, a project part of the Iskandar Development Region (IDR) (now Iskandar Malaysia) was announced on 30 July 2006. Construction began on 2008 and was completed on 2011.

Bridges in Johor
Bridges completed in 2011
Johor Bahru District